Ardisia amplexicaulis is a species of plant in the family Primulaceae. It is endemic to India.

References

amplexicaulis
Endemic flora of India (region)
Endangered flora of Asia
Taxonomy articles created by Polbot